

Events
John D'Amato, the boss of the New Jersey mafia family is shot and killed by Anthony Capo on the orders of Stefano Vitabile. According to later testimony by Capo, D'Amato was killed because he was homosexual, an offence punishable by death within the Mafia.
January 22 - Five top New England mobsters, including consigliere Joseph "J.R." Russo and capo Vincent M. Ferrara, plead guilty to racketeering, extortion, gambling and involvement in the 1985 murder of Vincent Limoli.
December 2 – Lucchese soldier Patrick Testa is shot to death allegedly byTommy Jones, a hitman and Los Angeles crime family associate, in the garage of a Brooklyn used car lot. The hit was allegedly ordered by Anthony Casso, the underboss of the Family at the time.

Arts and literature
The American Gangster (documentary)
American Me (film) starring Edward James Olmos and William Forsythe
Hard Boiled (film) starring Chow Yun-fat and Tony Leung Chiu Wai
Hoffa (film) starring Jack Nicholson, and Danny DeVito
Juice (film) starring Omar Epps, Tupac Shakur and Samuel L. Jackson
Teamster Boss: The Jackie Presser Story (film) starring Brian Dennehy, Jeff Daniels, María Conchita Alonso, Eli Wallach, Robert Prosky and Al Waxman
Who Do I Gotta Kill? (film) starring James Lorinz, John Costelloe, Vincent Pastore and Steve Buscemi
Reservoir Dogs (film)

Births

Deaths
John D'Amato "Johnny Boy", New Jersey mob boss
March 12 – Salvatore Lima, Sicilian politician and mafia associate
May 23 – Giovanni Falcone, Sicilian anti-mafia magistrate killed in the Capaci bombing
May 23 – Francesca Morvillo-Falcone, Sicilian magistrate and wife of Giovanni Falcone
May 23 – Rocco Di Cillo, Sicilian police officer
May 23 – Antonio Montinaro, Sicilian police officer
May 23 – Vito Schifani, Sicilian police officer
July 19 – Paolo Borsellino, Sicilian anti-mafia magistrate killed in the Via D'Amelio bombing
July 19 – Agostino Catalano, Sicilian police officer
July 19 – Walter Cosina, Sicilian police officer
July 19 – Emanuela Loi, Sicilian police officer
July 19 – Vincenzo Li Muli, Sicilian police officer
July 19 – Claudio Traina, Sicilian police officer
December 2 – Patrick Testa, Lucchese Family soldier

Notes

Organized crime
Years in organized crime